The 1992–93 Northern Football League season was the 95th in the history of Northern Football League, a football competition in England.

Division One

Division One featured 16 clubs which competed in the division last season, along with four new clubs, promoted from Division Two:
 Chester-le-Street Town
 Durham City
 Hebburn
 Stockton

League table

Division Two

Division Two featured 16 clubs which competed in the division last season, along with four new clubs.
 Clubs relegated from Division One:
 Langley Park
 Shildon
 Whickham
 Plus:
 Eppleton Colliery Welfare, joined from the Wearside Football League

League table

References

External links
 Northern Football League official site

Northern Football League seasons
1992–93 in English football leagues